Buon Natale is a phrase meaning "Happy Christmas" or "Merry Christmas" in Italian.

It may also refer to:

 Buon Natale, a cultural festival held at the premises of Thrissur city in Kerala 
 Buon Natale: The Christmas Album, a 2013 album by Italian operatic pop trio Il Volo
 Buon Natale... buon anno, a 1989 Italian comedy drama film directed by Luigi Comencini